Cottonwoods Station was a stop on the San Antonio-San Diego Mail Line and later the Butterfield Overland Mail stagecoach station in El Paso County, Texas.

Its location was described by Waterman L. Ormsby, a reporter who rode the first westbound stagecoach on the Butterfield Overland Mail:

About 21 miles from Franklin we changed horses at a station in a pretty grove of cottonwood trees - the only habitation before reaching Fort Fillmore eighteen miles further on.

Cottonwoods Station, according to Ormsby, was 21 miles above Franklin, Texas on the old road into New Mexico, along the Rio Grande. G. Baily, a postal inspector, reported it in 1858 to be 22 miles from Franklin. The station is thought to be somewhere in Anthony, Texas although the exact location is still in dispute.

References

Geography of El Paso County, Texas
Former populated places in Texas
San Antonio–San Diego Mail Line
Butterfield Overland Mail in Texas
American frontier
Stagecoach stations in Texas